Kuemper Catholic School System is a private, Roman Catholic PK-12 school in Carroll, Iowa.  It is located in the Roman Catholic Diocese of Sioux City. It includes the elementary/middle school division and Kuemper Catholic High School, held in four buildings.

History
The roots of Kuemper Catholic School go all the way back to 1874 with the Mt. Carmel parish began a small pioneering Catholic school.  By 1916, each of the 12 area parishes surrounding Carroll built their own Catholic grade school, and eventually Catholic high schools were also established in Breda, Mt. Carmel, Templeton, and Vail.

Fr. Joseph Kuemper (1855-1923) left his mark and an important legacy on Carroll county's 20th century history.

St. Bernard High School in Breda consolidated into Kuemper High in 1979.

The Christ the King School in Breda, along with the Holy Trinity Catholic grade school, consolidated into Kuemper Catholic System in 2003.

Buildings
The main administrative headquarters of the Kuemper System are on the second floor of the St. Angela Center. The system has four buildings: Holy Spirit Center for kindergarten through grade 3, the third and fourth floors of St. Angela Center for grades 7 and 8, St. Lawrence Center for grades 4–6, and Kuemper High School for grades 9–12. Preschool and optional kindergarten classes are held in the Kuemper High building's first floor although the preschool/kindergarten administration is at Holy Spirit Center. Kuemper High and St. Angela Center are connected to one another.

Athletics
The Knights compete within the Hawkeye 10 Conference and are part of the Iowa High School Athletic Association's class 2A in most sports.

Fall Sports 
Cross Country (boys and girls)
Football
The Knights won the 2013 Class 2A football championship 31–28 over Waukon High School.
Volleyball

Winter Sports 
Basketball (boys and girls)
Bowling
Wrestling

Spring Sports 
Golf (boys and girls)
Soccer (boys and girls)
Tennis (boys and girls)
Track and Field (boys and girls)

Summer Sports 
Baseball
Softball

See also
List of high schools in Iowa

Notable alumni
 Nick Nurse (1985) - Toronto Raptors head coach

Notes and references

External links
 Kuemper Catholic School System

Carroll, Iowa
Catholic elementary schools in the United States
Catholic secondary schools in Iowa
Private high schools in Iowa
Schools in Carroll County, Iowa
Educational institutions established in 1909
1909 establishments in Iowa